Børge Anders Børresen (25 May 1919 in Vejle – 4 March 2007 in Vejle) was a Danish sailor in the Dragon class. He became World Champion in 1993 crewing for Jesper Bank.

See also
BB 10

References

1919 births
2007 deaths
Danish male sailors (sport)
Dragon class sailors
People from Vejle Municipality
Sportspeople from the Region of Southern Denmark